The original South Korean counterpart of the television mystery music game show I Can See Your Voice premiered the inaugural first season on Mnet and tvN on February 26, 2015.

Gameplay

Format
Under the original format, the guest artist can eliminate one or two mystery singers after each round. The game concludes with the last mystery singer standing which depends on the outcome of a duet performance with a guest artist.

Rewards
If the singer is good, he/she will have release a digital single; if the singer is bad, he/she wins .

Rounds
Each episode presents the guest artist with seven people whose identities and singing voices are kept concealed until they are eliminated to perform on the "stage of truth" or remain in the end to perform the final duet.

Episodes

Guest artists

Panelists

Star Wars (May 14, 2015) 
In this episode, ten returning mystery singers are separated into two teams (each of them are represented by four good singers and one bad singer). For each round, a mystery singer is chosen by the team's panelists to compete for a "showdown". Afterward, voting is done through audience majority, and the votes are accumulated for the winning team.

Reception

Television ratings

Sources: Nielsen Media and

Notes

References

I Can See Your Voice (South Korean game show)
2015 South Korean television seasons